Friedrich Stowasser (15 December 1928 – 19 February 2000), better known by his pseudonym Friedensreich Regentag Dunkelbunt Hundertwasser, was an Austrian visual artist and architect who also worked in the field of environmental protection.

Hundertwasser stood out as an opponent of "a straight line" and any standardization, expressing this concept in the field of building design. His best known work is the Hundertwasserhaus in Vienna, which has become a notable place of interest in the Austrian capital, characterised by imaginative vitality and uniqueness.

Biography 
The Nazi era was a very difficult time for Hundertwasser and his mother Elsa, who were Jewish. They avoided persecution by posing as Christians, a credible ruse as Hundertwasser's father had been a Catholic. Hundertwasser was baptized as a Catholic in 1935. To remain inconspicuous, Hundertwasser also joined the Hitler Youth.

Hundertwasser developed artistic skills early on. After the war, he spent three months at the Academy of Fine Arts in Vienna. At this time, he began to sign his art as Hundertwasser instead of Stowasser. He left to travel, using a small set of paints he carried at all times to sketch anything that caught his eye. In Florence, he met the young French painter René Brô for the first time and they became lifelong friends. Hundertwasser's first commercial painting success was in 1952–53 with an exhibition in Vienna.

His adopted surname is based on the translation of "sto" (the Slavic word for "(one) hundred") into German. The name Friedensreich has a double meaning as "Peace-realm" or "Peace-rich" (in the sense of "peaceful"). Therefore, his name Friedensreich Hundertwasser translates directly into English as "Peace-Realm Hundred-Water". The other names he chose for himself, Regentag and Dunkelbunt, translate to "Rainy day" and "Darkly multi-coloured".

In the early 1950s, he entered the field of architecture. Hundertwasser also worked in the field of applied art, creating flags, stamps, coins, and posters. His most famous flag is his koru flag (designed in 1983), as well as several postage stamps for the Austrian Post Office. He also designed stamps for Cape Verde and for the United Nations postal administration in Geneva on the occasion of the 35th anniversary of the Universal Declaration of Human Rights.

In 1957 Hundertwasser acquired a farm on the edge of Normandy. Hundertwasser married Herta Leitner in 1958 but they divorced two years later. He married again in 1962 to the Japanese artist Yuko Ikewada but she divorced him in 1966. By this time, he had gained a popular reputation for his art.

In 1964 Hundertwasser bought "Hahnsäge", a former saw mill, in the sparsely populated Lower Austria's Waldviertel. There, far from the hustle and bustle and surrounded by nature, he set up a new home.

He spent some time in the 1960s in the Tooro Kingdom in Uganda, Central Africa, where he painted a number of works and named them after the kingdom.

In 1972 Hundertwasser incorporated a stock company, the "Grüner Janura AG", in Switzerland; in 2008 it was renamed as "Namida AG". Hundertwasser managed his intellectual property rights through this company.

In the 1970s, Hundertwasser acquired several properties in the Bay of Islands in New Zealand, which include a total area of approximately 372 ha of the entire "Kaurinui" valley. There he realized his dream of living and working closely connected to nature. Beside other projects he designed the "Bottle House" there. He could live largely self-sufficiently using solar panels, a water wheel and a biological water purification plant. His first grass roof experiments took place there.

In 1979 Hundertwasser bought the vast historical garden Giardino Eden ('Garden of Eden') in Venice, including the Palazzo Villa delle Rose, from Alexandra of Yugoslavia via his Swiss company.

In 1980, Hundertwasser visited Washington D.C. to support activist Ralph Nader's efforts to oppose nuclear proliferation. Mayor Marion Barry declared 18 November to be Hundertwasser Day as a result. Hundertwasser planted trees in Judiciary Square and advocated on behalf of a co-op apartment owner who was taken to court for installing a bay window.

In 1982, Hundertwasser's only child, his daughter Heidi Trimmel, was born.

He died on Saturday, 19 February 2000, in the Pacific, on board of Queen Elizabeth 2 from a heart attack. According to his wish he was buried in harmony with nature on his land in New Zealand, in the Garden of the Happy Dead under a Tulip Tree.

Artistic style and themes 
 

Hundertwasser's original and unruly artistic vision expressed itself in pictorial art, environmentalism, philosophy, and design of facades, postage stamps, flags, and clothing (among other areas). The common themes in his work utilised bright colours, organic forms, a reconciliation of humans with nature, and a strong individualism, rejecting straight lines.

He remains sui generis, although his architectural work is comparable to Antoni Gaudí (1852–1926) in its use of biomorphic forms and the use of tile. He was also inspired by the art of the Vienna Secession, and by the Austrian painters Egon Schiele (1890–1918) and Gustav Klimt (1862–1918).

He was fascinated by spirals, and called straight lines "godless and immoral" and "something cowardly drawn with a rule, without thought or feeling" He called his theory of art "transautomatism", focusing on the experience of the viewer rather than the artist. This was encapsulated by his design of a new flag for New Zealand, which incorporated the image of the Koru a spiral shape based on the image of a new unfurling silver fern frond and symbolizing new life, growth, strength and peace according to the Māori people.

Architecture 

Even though Hundertwasser first achieved notoriety for his boldly-coloured paintings, he is more widely known for his individual architectural designs. These designs use irregular forms, and incorporate natural features of the landscape. The Hundertwasserhaus apartment block in Vienna has undulating floors ("an uneven floor is a melody to the feet"), a roof covered with earth and grass, and large trees growing from inside the rooms, with limbs extending from windows. He took no payment for the design of Hundertwasserhaus, declaring that it was worth the investment to "prevent something ugly from going up in its place".

From the early 1950s he increasingly focused on architecture, advocating more just human and environmental friendly buildings. This began with manifestos, essays and demonstrations. For example, he read out his "Mouldiness Manifesto against Rationalism in Architecture" in 1958 on the occasion of an art and architectural event held at the Seckau Monastery. He rejected the straight line and the functional architecture. In Munich in 1967 he gave a lecture called "Speech in Nude for the Right to a Third Skin". His lecture "Loose from Loos, A Law Permitting Individual Buildings Alterations or Architecture-Boycott Manifesto", was given at the Concordia Press Club in Vienna in 1968.

In the Mouldiness Manifesto he first claimed the "Window Right": "A person in a rented apartment must be able to lean out of his window and scrape off the masonry within arm's reach. And he must be allowed to take a long brush and paint everything outside within arm's reach. So that it will be visible from afar to everyone in the street that someone lives there who is different from the imprisoned, enslaved, standardised man who lives next door." In his nude speeches of 1967 and 1968 Hundertwasser condemned the enslavement of humans by the sterile grid system of conventional architecture and by the output of mechanised industrial production. He rejected rationalism, the straight line and functional architecture.

For Hundertwasser, human misery was a result of the rational, sterile, monotonous architecture, built following the tradition of the Austrian architect Adolf Loos, author of the modernist manifesto Ornament and crime (1908). He called for a boycott of this type of architecture, and demanded instead creative freedom of building, and the right to create individual structures. In 1972 he published the manifesto Your window right — your tree duty. Planting trees in an urban environment was to become obligatory: "If man walks in nature's midst, then he is nature's guest and must learn to behave as a well-brought-up guest." Hundertwasser propagated a type of architecture in harmony with nature in his ecological commitment. He campaigned for the preservation of the natural habitat and demanded a life in accordance with the laws of nature. He wrote numerous manifestos, lectured and designed posters in favor of nature protection, including against nuclear power, to save the oceans and the whales and to protect the rain forest. He was also an advocate of composting toilets and the principle of constructed wetland. He perceived feces not as nauseous but as part of the cycle of nature. His beliefs are testified by his manifesto The Holy Shit and his DIY guide for building a composting toilet.

In the 1970s, Hundertwasser had his first architectural models built. The models for the Eurovision TV-show "Wünsch Dir was" (Make a Wish) in 1972 exemplified his ideas on forested roofs, tree tenants and the window right. In these and similar models he developed new architectural shapes, such as the spiral house, the eye-slit house, the terrace house and the high-rise meadow house.
In 1974, Peter Manhardt made models for him of the pit-house, the grass roof house and the green service station – along with his idea of the invisible, inaudible Green Motorway.

In the early 1980s Hundertwasser remodelled the Rosenthal Factory in Selb, and the Mierka Grain Silo in Krems. These projects gave him the opportunity to act as what he called an "architecture doctor".

In architectural projects that followed he implemented window right and tree tenants, uneven floors, woods on the roof, and spontaneous vegetation. Works of this period include: housing complexes in Germany; a church in Bärnbach, Austria; a district heating plant in Vienna; an incineration plant and sludge centre in Osaka, Japan; a railway station in Uelzen; a winery in Napa Valley; and the Hundertwasser toilet in Kawakawa, New Zealand.

In 1999 Hundertwasser started his last project named Die Grüne Zitadelle von Magdeburg (in German). Although he never completed this work, the building was built a few years later in Magdeburg, a town in eastern Germany, and opened on 3 October 2005.

Buildings

 Hundertwasserhaus, Vienna, Austria
 District Heating Plant, Spittelau, Vienna, Austria
 Hundertwasserhaus Waldspirale, Darmstadt, Germany
 KunstHausWien, Vienna, Austria
 Kindergarten Heddernheim, Frankfurt
 Motorway Restaurant, Bad Fischau-Brunn, Austria
 Hot Springs Village, Bad Blumau, Austria
 Hundertwasserkirche, Bärnbach, Austria
 Markthalle, Altenrhein, Switzerland
 Wohnen unterm Regenturm, Plochingen, Germany
 Quixote Winery, Napa Valley, United States, 1988–1998 (his only building in the US)
 Maishima Incineration Plant, Osaka, Japan, 1997–2000
 Hundertwasser toilet, Kawakawa, New Zealand, 1999
 Hundertwasser "environmental railway station", Uelzen, Germany, 1999–2001
 Die Grüne Zitadelle von Magdeburg, Magdeburg, Germany, 2003–2005
 Ronald McDonald Kinder Vallei, Valkenburg aan de Geul, Netherlands
 Kuchlbauer-Turm, Abensberg, Germany, 2008–2010

An art gallery featuring Hundertwasser's work will be established in a council building in Whangārei, New Zealand, and will bring to fruition his 1993 plans for improving the building.

Paintings 

 1959 – Kaaba-League of legends, die halbe Insel, Hamburg Collection Poppe
 1954 – Hundertwasser develops the Transautomatism art theory.
 1967 – "Kingdom of the Toro" series
 various Furoshiki designs

Stamps and medals 
The extensive work of Hundertwasser includes 26 stamps for various postal administrations. Seventeen of these designs were – in part after his death – implemented as a postage stamp.
 Austria
 Modern Art in Austria, 1975
 Council of Europe Summit, Vienna, 1993
 80th Birthday Friedensreich Hundertwasser (4 stamps in the form of a block), 2008
 Senegal – art on stamps (3 stamps), 1979
 Cape Verde Islands – Shipping, 1982 (printed but not issued), 1985 (issued with overprint)
 United Nations Postal Administration (Vienna, Geneva and New York ) – 35th Anniversary of the Universal Declaration of Human Rights (6 stamps), 1983
 Liechtenstein – Homage to Liechtenstein, 1993

Two of the unrealized designs are alternative designs for a stamp issue (United Nations, Senegal) and were therefore not performed. Seven other designs created for the postal administrations of Morocco and French Polynesia were not realized as a postage stamp.

In addition, Friedensreich Hundertwasser, has adapted some of his works for stamp issues. On the basis of these adaptations have been stamps issued by:
 France – 2 badges for € Europe, 1994
 United Nations Postal Administration (Vienna, Geneva and New York) – Social Summit (3 stamps), 1995
 Luxembourg – European Capital of Culture (3 stamps), 1995
 Liechtenstein – EXPO 2000 in Hanover (3 stamps), 2000

The Austrian post office used more Hundertwasser motives for the European edition 1987 (Modern architecture, Hundertwasser House), on the occasion of his death in 2000 (painting Blue Blues, under the WIPA 2000) and 2004 National Donauauen (poster: The outdoors is our freedom at civil protests in Hainburg).

For the first time a Hundertwasser motive was also used on a Cuban stamp, as part of the art exhibition Salon de Mayo (Havana, 1967).

With the exception of service marks for the Council of Europe and the Cuban stamp, all stamps were engraved by Wolfgang Seidel and by the Austrian State Printing Office in a complex combination printing process produces (intaglio printing, rotogravure printing, as well as metal stamping).

Hundertwasser also worked as a medallist.

Books 
 In 1989 Brockhaus released a 24-volume limited special edition of its encyclopedia with 1800 pieces, entirely designed by Hundertwasser. Each individual cover of this edition varies in colour of the linen as well as in the colours of foil stamping, making each copy a unique piece. "No band, no cover I designed the encyclopedia is equal to the other. Nevertheless, they attack each other with all their differences and come together to form an overall picture. This is networking among themselves a symbol of knowledge, the Brockhaus gives." (F. Hundertwasser)
 Stowasser: Latin-German school dictionary of Joseph Maria Stowasser. For the newly published 1994 edition of the dictionary "Little Stowasser" Hundertwasser-designed textile bindings in 100 different colour variations.
 Bible. 1995, Size: 20x28, 5 cm, 1688 pages, 80 full-page images, including 30 collages, the hundreds of water specifically for this Bible – Edition has created. Each Bible is characterized by a different colour combination of linen textiles. Also the specimens differ in the bright shining metal colour imprints. Each cover is made mainly by hand.

Political views 
Beginning in the 1950s Hundertwasser traveled globally promoting ecological causes. In 1959 Hundertwasser got involved with helping the Dalai Lama escape from Tibet by campaigning for the Tibetan religious leader in Carl Laszlo's magazine Panderma. In later years, when he was already a known artist, Friedensreich Hundertwasser became an environmental activist and most recently operated as a more prominent opponent of the European Union, advocating the preservation of regional peculiarities.

Among the lesser-known facets of Hundertwasser's personality is his commitment to constitutional monarchy: Austria needs something to look up to, consisting of perennial higher valuesof which one now hardly dares to speaksuch as beauty, culture, internal and external peace, faith, richness of heart [...] Austria needs an emperor, who is subservient to the people. A superior and radiant figure in whom everyone has confidence, because this great figure is a possession of all. The rationalist way of thinking has brought us, in this century, an ephemeral higher, American standard of living at the expense of nature and creation, which is now coming to an end, for it is destroying our heart, our quality of life, our longing, without which an Austrian does not want to live. It is outrageous that Austria has an emperor who did no evil to anyone but is still treated like a leper. Austria needs a crown! Long live Austria! Long live the constitutional monarchy! Long live Otto von Habsburg!- Friedensreich Hundertwasser, Für die Wiederkehr der konstitutionellen Monarchie (For the Return of the Constitutional Monarchy).Kaurinui, New Zealand, 28 March 1983; dedicated, on 14 May 1987, to Otto von Habsburg for his 75th birthday.

Influence 

 In New Zealand his design beliefs have been adopted by a New Zealand terracotta tile manufacturer, who promotes his style as "Organic Tiling". The tiling is designed by Chris Southern, who worked with Hundertwasser on the Kawakawa toilets. In 2022 an art gallery opened in Whangarei, New Zealand, styled on his methods and including his artwork.
 In 1987, at the request of John Lydon, British designer and illustrator Richard Evans produced a homage to Hundertwasser for the cover of Public Image Limited's album Happy?.

Awards 
 1959: Sanbra prize at the São Paulo Biennale, V.
 1961: Mainichi Prize in Tokyo
 1980: Grand Austrian State Prize for Visual Arts
 1981: Austrian Nature Protection Award
 1982: Award-winning Author of the year
 1985: Officier de l'Ordre des Arts et des Lettres
 1988: Gold Medal of the City of Vienna
 1988: Gold Medal of Styria
 1997: Grand Decoration of Honour for Services to the Republic of Austria

Documentary films 
 Ferry Radax: Hundertwasser – Leben in Spiralen (Hundertwasser – life in spirals, 1966). Ferry Radax first documentary on his fellow-countryman.
 Ferry Radax: Hundertwasser in Neuseeland (Hundertwasser in New Zealand, 1998). After 30 years Ferry Radax made a second portrait of the artist.
 Peter Schamoni: Hundertwasser Regentag (Hundertwasser's Rainy Day, 1972). An award-winning German documentary about the artist rebuilding an old wooden ship called Regentag (Rainy Day).

Literature

Catalogue raisonné 
 Hundertwasser, Vollständiger Oeuvre-Katalog publiziert aus Anlass der 100. Ausstellung der Kestner-Gesellschaft, Text by Wieland Schmied (ed.), with 100 coloured reproductions. Kestner-Gesellschaft Hannover, Hanover, 1964
 David Kung (ed.), The Woodcut Works of Hundertwasser 1960–1975, Glarus: Gruener Janura AG, 1977
 Walter Koschatzky, Friedensreich Hundertwasser. The complete graphic work 1951–1986. New York: Rizzoli International Publications, 1986.
 Hundertwasser 1928–2000. Catalogue raisonné. Vol. I: Wieland Schmied: Personality, Life, Work. Vol. II: Andrea Fürst: Catalogue raisonné. Cologne: Taschen, 2000/2002
 Hundertwasser Graphic Works 1994–2000, Vienna: Museums Betriebs Gesellschaft, 2001

Monographs 
 Werner Hofmann, Hundertwasser, Salzburg: Verlag Galerie Welz, 1965 (German and English editions)
 Francois Mathey, Hundertwasser, Naefels: Bonfini Press Corporation, 1985
 Harry Rand, Hundertwasser, Cologne: Taschen, 1991 (reprint 2018)
 Pierre Restany, Hundertwasser. The Power of Art – The Painter-King with the Five Skins, Cologne: Taschen, 1998
 Hundertwasser 1928–2000, Catalogue Raisonné, Vol. 1 by Wieland Schmied: Personality, Life, Work, Vol. 2 by Andrea Christa Fürst: Catalogue Raisonné, Cologne: Taschen, 2000/2002
 Pierre Restany, Hundertwasser, New York: Parkstone, 2008

Architectural monographs 
 Robert Schediwy, Hundertwassers Häuser. Dokumente einer Kontroverse über zeitgemäße Architektur. Vienna: Edition Tusch, 1999, .
 Hundertwasser Architecture, For a more human architecture in harmony with nature, Cologne: Taschen, 1997 (reprint 2018)

Exhibitions 

 Hundertwasser Malerei, Art Club, Vienna, 1952
 Studio Paul Facchetti, Paris, 1954
 Galerie H. Kamer, Paris, 1957
 Rétrospective Hundertwasser 1950–1960, Galerie Raymond Cordier, Paris, 1960
 Tokyo Gallery, Tokyo, 1961
 Hundertwasser ist ein Geschenk für Deutschland, Galerie Änne Abels, Cologne, 1963
 Travelling Exhibition 1964/65, Hundertwasser: Kestner-Gesellschaft, Hanover; Kunsthalle Bern; Karl-Ernst-Osthaus-Museum, Hagen; Stedelijk Museum, Amsterdam; Moderna Museet, Stockholm; Museum des 20. Jahrhunderts, Vienna
 Travelling Exhibition 1968/69: USA, Hundertwasser; University Art Museum, Berkeley; Santa Barbara Museum of Art, Santa Barbara; The Museum of Fine Arts, Houston; The Arts Club of Chicago; The Galerie St. Etienne, New York; The Phillips Collection, Washington DC
 Galerie Brockstedt, Hamburg, 1968/1969
 Aberbach Fine Art, New York, 1973
 Travelling Exhibition 1973/74, Hundertwasser 1973 New Zealand, City of Auckland Art Gallery, Auckland; Govett-Brewster Art Gallery, New Plymouth; The New Zealand Academy of Fine Arts, Wellington; City Art Gallery, Christchurch; City Art Gallery, Dunedin
 Travelling Exhibition, Hundertwasser 1974 Australia, National Gallery of Victoria, Melbourne; Albert Hall, Canberra; Opera, Sydney
 Stowasser 1943 bis Hundertwasser 1974, Albertina, Vienna, 1974
 Haus der Kunst, Munich, 1975
 Austria Presents Hundertwasser to the Continents. The World Travelling Museum Exhibition took place in 43 museums in 27 countries from 1975 to 1983.
 Hundertwasser. Das gesamte graphische Werk, Tapisserien, Mönchehaus-Museum für Moderne Kunst, Goslar, Germany, 1978
 Hundertwasser Tapisserien, Österreichisches Museum für angewandte Kunst, Vienna, 1979
 Travelling Exhibition 1979–1981, Hundertwasser Is Painting, Aberbach Fine Art, New York; Tokyo Gallery, Tokyo; Galerie Brockstedt, Hamburg; Hammerlunds Kunsthandel; Galerie Würthle, Vienna
 Hundertwasser – Sérigraphies, eaux fortes, gravures sur bois japonaises, lithographies, Artcurial, Paris, 1980
 Hundertwasser – Peintures Récentes, Artcurial, Paris, 1982
 Paintings by Hundertwasser, Aberbach Fine Art, New York, 1983
 Hundertwasser – Kunst und Umwelt, Mönchehaus-Museum für Moderne Kunst, Goslar, Germany, 1984
 Hundertwasser à Tahiti – Gravure, Musée Gauguin, Tahiti, 1985/1986
 Hundertwasser – Aus dem graphischen Werk, BAWAG Foundation, Vienna, 1986
 Travelling exhibition 1989: Japan, Hundertwasser; Tokyo Metropolitan Teien Art Museum, Tokyo; Iwaki City Art Museum, Fukushima; Ohara Museum of Art, Okayama
 Friedensreich Hundertwasser – Originale, Objekte, Gobelins, Graphiken, Galerie am Lindenplatz, Schaan, Liechtenstein, 1993
 Hundertwasser – Important works, Landau Fine Art, Montreal, 1994/1995
 Friedensreich Hundertwasser – Die Waagerechte gehört der Natur, Mönchehaus-Museum für Moderne Kunst, Goslar, Germany, 1997
 Hundertwasser Retrospektive, Institut Mathildenhöhe, Darmstadt, Germany, 1998
 Travelling Exhibition 1998/99: Japan, Hundertwasser; Isetan Museum of Art, Tokyo; Museum "EKi", Kyoto; Sakura City Museum of Art, Chiba
 Travelling Exhibition 1999: Japan, Hundertwasser Architecture – For a More Human Architecture in Harmony With Nature, Takamatsu City Museum of Art, Takamatsu; Nagoya City Art Museum, Nagoya; Hyogo Prefectural Museum of Modern Art, Kobe; The Museum of Modern Art, Saitama
 Hundertwasser – Peintures Parcours Rétrospectif, Galerie Patrice Trigano, Paris, 1999/2000
 Hundertwasser Gedächtnisausstellung, Neue Galerie der Stadt Linz, Austria, 2000
 Hundertwasser 1928–2000, Russeck Gallery, Palm Beach, 2000
 Hundertwasser-Architektur – Von der Utopie zur Realität, KunstHausWien, Vienna, 2000/2001
 Hommage à Hundertwasser 1928–2000, Musée des Beaux-Arts et de la Dentelle, Alençon, France, 2001
 Hundertwasser. Kunst – Mensch – Natur, Minoritenkloster, Tulln and Egon Schiele-Museum, Tulln, Lower Austria, 2004
 Hundertwasser. Fantastische Architectuur, Kunsthal Rotterdam, 2004
 Travelling Exhibition 2005/06: Germany, Friedensreich Hundertwasser – Ein Sonntagsarchitekt. Gebaute Träume und Sehnsüchte; Deutsches Architekturmuseum (DAM), Frankfurt; Stiftung Schleswig-Holsteinische Landesmuseen, Schloss Gottorf; Kunstforum der Bausparkasse Schwäbisch Hall AG, Schwäbisch Hall; Städtische Museen Zwickau, Kunstsammlungen, Zwickau
 Travelling Exhibition 2006/07: Japan, Remainders of an Ideal. The Visions and Practices of HUNDERTWASSER, The National Museum of Modern Art, Kyoto; Musee d`art Mercian Karuizawa; Mitsukoshi Museum, Tokyo; Shimonoseki Museum, Yamaguchi
 The Art of Friedensreich Hundertwasser. A Magical Eccentric, Szépmüvészeti Museum, Budapest, 2007/2008
 Hundertwasser. La raccolta dei sogni, Art Forum Würth, Capena near Rome, 2008
 Hundertwasser – Jüdische Aspekte, Jüdisches Museum Rendsburg, Julius-Magnus Haus, Rendsburg, Germany, 2008
 Hundertwasser. In Harmonie mit der Natur, Minoritenkloster, Tulln, Austria, 2008
 "den Cherub betören". Friedensreich Hundertwasser und die Sehnsucht des Menschen nach dem Paradies, Christuskirche in Mainz and Landesmuseum Mainz, Germany, 2008
 Musee d'Unterlinden, Colmar, France, 2008
 The Yet Unknown Hundertwasser, KunstHausWien, Vienna, 2008/2009
 H U N D E R T W A S S E R. Symbiose von Technik, Ökologie und Kunst. Die Wiedergutmachung an Industriegebäuden, Fernwärme Wien, Vienna, 2009
 Hundertwasser-Pfad durch die Fernwärme Wien, Vienna, 2009
 HUNDERTWASSER 2010 IN SEOUL, Seoul Arts Center – Design Museum, Seoul, Korea, 2010/2011
 Hundertwasser – The Art of the Green Path, 20 years KunstHausWien anniversary exhibition, KunstHausWien, Austria, 2011
 Hundertwasser – Le Rêve de la couleur, Centre de la Vieille Charité, Marseille, France, 2012
 Friedensreich Hundertwasser: Against the Grain. Works 1949–1970. Kunsthalle Bremen, Germany, 2012/2013
 Hundertwasser – Japan and the Avant-garde. Österreichische Galerie Belvedere, Unteres Belvedere/Orangerie, Vienna, 2013
 Dans la peau de Hundertwasser, Museé en Herbe, Paris, 2014
 HUNDERTWASSER: DE RECHTE LIJN IS GODDELOOS, Cobra Museum voor Moderne Kunst, Amstelveen, Netherlands, 2013/2014
 Hundertwasser, Arken Museum, Ishøj, Denmark, 2014
 Friedensreich Hundertwasser – Die Ernte der Träume, Sammlung Würth, Forum Würth Arlesheim, Switzerland, 2017
 Hundertwasser – Lebenslinien, Osthaus Museum Hagen, Hagen, Germany, 2015
 Hundertwasser. Schön & Gut, Buchheim Museum, Bernried, Germany, 2016/2017
 Hundertwasser – The green city, Sejong Museum of Art, Seoul, Korea, 2016/2017
 Hundertwasser – En route pour le bonheur!, Musée de Millau et de Grands Causses, Millau, Frankreich, 2018

Collections 

Akademie der bildenden Künste, Gemäldegalerie, Vienna, Austria
Akademie der bildenden Künste, Kupferstichkabinett, Vienna, Austria
Albertina, Vienna, Austria
Albertina, Vienna – Sammlung Essl
Albertina, Vienna – Sammlung Batliner
Artothek des Bundes, Vienna, Austria
Belvedere Museum, Austria.
Brooklyn Museum, New York, USA
Centre National d'Art et de Culture Georges Pompidou, Paris, France
Cincinnati Art Museum, USA
Erzbischöfliches Dom- und Diözesanmuseum, Vienna, Austria
Hamburger Kunsthalle, Germany
Henie-Onstad Kunstsenter, Høvikodden, Norway
Herbert Liaunig Privatstiftung, Austria
Hilti Foundation, Liechtenstein
Iwaki City Art Museum, Japan
KUNSTEN Museum of Modern Art Aalborg, Denmark
Kunsthalle Bremen, Germany
KunstHausWien, Museum Hundertwasser, Vienna, Austria
KunstHausVienna, Museum Hundertwasser, Vienna, Austria
Kupferstichkabinett, Staatliche Museen zu Berlin – Preußischer Kulturbesitz, Germany
Louisiana Museum of Modern Art, Humlebaek, Denmark
MAK – Museum für angewandte Kunst, Vienna, Austria
McMaster Museum of Art, McMaster University, Hamilton, Canada
Mishkan Le'Omanut, Museum of Art, Ein-Harod, Israel
MUMOK – Museum Moderner Kunst Stiftung Ludwig Wien, Vienna, Austria
Muscarelle Museum of Art, Williamsburg, Virginia, USA
Musée d'Art moderne, Troyes, France
Museo de Arte Contemporáneo, Santiago de Chile
Museo del Novecento, Collezione Boschi di Stefano, Milan, Italy
Museo Thyssen-Bornemisza, Madrid, Spain
Museu de Arte Contemporanea da USP, São Paulo, Brasil
Museum der Moderne – Rupertinum, Salzburg, Austria
Museum für Kunst und Gewerbe, Hamburg, Germany
Museum of Modern Art, New York
Museumslandschaft Hessen Kassel, Museum Schloss Wilhelmshöhe, Graphische Sammlung, Germany
muzej moderne i suvremene umjetnosti – museum of modern and contemporary art, Rijeka, Croatia
Nagoya City Art Museum, Japan
National Gallery of Art, Washington
Nationalgalerie Prag / Narodni galerie v Praze, Czech Republic
Ny Carlsberg Glyptotek, Kopenhagen, Denmark
Ohara Museum of Art, Okayama, Japan
Osthaus Museum Hagen, Germany
Peggy Guggenheim Collection, Venice, Italy
Pinakothek der Moderne, Munich, Germany
Saint Louis University, USA
Sammlung Würth, Künzelsau, Germany
San Diego Museum of Art, USA
San Francisco Museum of Modern Art, USA
Solomon R. Guggenheim Museum, New York, USA
Spencer Museum of Art, Lawrence, USA
Sprengel Museum Hannover, Hanover, Germany
Statens Museum for Kunst, Copenhagen, Denmark
Stedelijk Museum Amsterdam, Netherlands
Städtische Kunsthalle Mannheim, Germany
Takamatsu City Museum of Art, Japan
The Gerard L. Cafesjian Collection, Yerevan, Armenia
The Heckscher Museum of Art, Huntington, USA
The Museum of Modern Art, New York, USA
The Nelson-Atkins Museum of Art, Kansas City, USA
The Niigata Prefectural Museum of Modern Art, Japan
Wien Museum, Vienna, Austria

See also 
 Roof garden
 Green roof
 Urban agriculture
 Skyrise greenery
 Cool roof
 Green wall

Notes

References 

Sources
 Harry Rand (2007). Hundertwasser 25th. .

External links 

 Website of Hundertwasser Foundation
 Hundertwasser Online Encyclopedia
 On Hundertwasser
 Hundertwasserhaus website

1928 births
2000 deaths
20th-century Austrian painters
Austrian emigrants to New Zealand
Austrian male painters
Abstract painters
Austrian male sculptors
Austrian architects
Austrian performance artists
Expressionist architects
Organic architecture
Green thinkers
Austrian stamp designers
Flag designers
Austrian expatriates in New Zealand
Austrian Roman Catholics
Austrian people of Jewish descent
Artists from Vienna
People who died at sea
Academy of Fine Arts Vienna alumni
People from Kawakawa, New Zealand
Recipients of the Grand Decoration for Services to the Republic of Austria
Recipients of the Grand Austrian State Prize
20th-century Austrian sculptors
Austrian monarchists
Hitler Youth members
20th-century Austrian male artists